Mike McLeod (Michael James McLeod; born 25 January 1952 in Dilston, Northumberland) is a British former athlete who competed mainly in the 10,000 metres.

Athletics career
McLeod competed for Great Britain in the 1984 Summer Olympics held in Los Angeles, United States in the 10,000 metres where he won the silver medal. McLeod only finished third but second placed Martti Vainio had been disqualified for taking anabolic steroids. Race winner Alberto Cova has since admitted to using blood transfusions during his career, and there has been speculation that McLeod could and should therefore be eventually awarded the gold medal.

McLeod ran for Elswick Harriers of Newcastle upon Tyne from an early age winning many races on a regional, national and international scale. One of his greatest achievements was being presented with an Olympic silver medal at the Los Angeles Olympic Games in 1984, the best performance by a British athlete at that time. Twice winner of the Golden 10,000 metre which seems to be now known as the world championships. McLeod won the Morpeth to Newcastle road race on five occasions with 63 minutes and 25 seconds being his best time in 1980. He won the Saltwell Harriers 10k road race 17 years in a row. McLeod also won the first Great North Run and went on to win it again the following year. He competed abroad and won the Giro al Sas 10K race in Italy in 1984.

He represented England and won a bronze medal in the 10,000 metres event, at the 1978 Commonwealth Games in Edmonton, Alberta, Canada. Four years later he represented England, once again in the 10,000 metres event, at the 1982 Commonwealth Games in Brisbane, Queensland, Australia. A third Commonwealth Games appearance arrived in 1986 when he represented England, at the 1986 Commonwealth Games in Edinburgh, Scotland.

Personal life
His son, Ryan McLeod, is now a professional runner. Mike is his coach. His brother is Olympian Tony McLeod.

Business activities 
McLeod is owner/director of Abacus Printers, based in Gateshead. He is also President of Future Sport NE, a charity supporting young people in sport in the North East of England.

References

External links
 

Living people
1952 births
Sportspeople from Northumberland
English male long-distance runners
Olympic athletes of Great Britain
Olympic silver medallists for Great Britain
Athletes (track and field) at the 1980 Summer Olympics
Athletes (track and field) at the 1984 Summer Olympics
Athletes (track and field) at the 1988 Summer Olympics
Commonwealth Games medallists in athletics
Athletes (track and field) at the 1978 Commonwealth Games
Athletes (track and field) at the 1982 Commonwealth Games
Athletes (track and field) at the 1986 Commonwealth Games
Medalists at the 1984 Summer Olympics
Olympic silver medalists in athletics (track and field)
Commonwealth Games bronze medallists for England
Medallists at the 1978 Commonwealth Games